The Gaza City Mall is a three-story shopping mall in Gaza City. It was the city's first indoor mall.

Owned by the Al-Hayat Tureed Company (or the Gaza Shopping Centre company), the mall is located just west of Gaza City near Haidar Abdel Shafi Square.

History
Construction began in August 2010 on the 3,000 square meter shopping complex housing a cinema, restaurants, and retail shops.

The grand opening was attended by the Labour Minister Abu Osama al-Kurd. Upon opening, the mall was 2-storey high with no elevator.

See also

 Gaza Mall

References

Shopping malls in the State of Palestine
Companies based in the State of Palestine
Buildings and structures in Gaza City